Lakes Region or Lake Region may refer to:

Regions
 African Great Lakes region
 Finger Lakes Region, New York, United States
 Great Lakes region, North America
 Lakes Region (New Hampshire), United States
 Los Lagos Region, Chile
 Turkish Lakes Region, Anatolia, Turkey
 Uwharrie Lakes Region, North Carolina, United States
 Willandra Lakes Region, New South Wales, Australia

Education
 Lake Region High School (disambiguation), multiple high schools
 Lake Region State College, a two-year public college in Devils Lake, North Dakota, United States
 Lake Region Union High School, a high school in Barton, Vermont, United States
 Lakes Region Community College, Laconia, New Hampshire, United States

Other uses
 Lakes Region Facility, a former state prison in Laconia, New Hampshire, United States
 Lakes Region League, an athletics league in New Hampshire
 Lakes Region News Club, a private newspaper publishing company in New Hampshire